Tewksbury Memorial High School (also TMHS or Tewksbury High School) is a suburban public high school located at 320 Pleasant Street in Tewksbury, Massachusetts, United States. Serving grades 912, it is the only public high school in the town. Its total enrollment for the 2018–2019 school year was 916 students.

Demographics

Athletics

The Redmen are a member of the Merrimack Valley Conference. The MIAA classifies them as a Division 2 school for most sports. Significant rivals include conference foes Andover, Billerica, Central Catholic, and Chelmsford. Their biggest rival is neighboring Wilmington of the Middlesex League, whom the football team plays every Thanksgiving.

In 2013, the football team went undefeated at 13-0 and won the Division 3 State Championship, defeating Plymouth South by a score of 42–14.

Other than their football team, TMHS's boys' soccer team, field hockey team, track, and XC team has seen recent success.

Football State Champions - 1985, 1996, 2013
Football State Finalists - 1981, 1990, 1995, 2011

Student activities 

 Academic Decathlon – This team is organized to develop and provide academic competitions with students from other schools to promote learning and academic excellence among students of all achievement levels.
 Band – These are groups of students who perform throughout the year using their musical talents in Concert and Marching Band.
 Class Council – This is made up of students elected to positions of both officers and representatives. They organize fundraisers and activities that benefit the students' senior year. 
 Chorus - These are talented group of students who perform throughout the year
 DECA – Marketing students can participate in applications of real-life business situations at district, state, and national conferences.
 Drama Club – Students can express their dramatic talents in stage productions throughout the year. Renamed to TMHS Theatre Company in 2014.
 ECHO– Students can participate in cultural events as well as perform charitable and community service as members of this.
 Fall Sports – Golf, Football, Cheerleading, Boys' and Girls' Cross-Country, Field Hockey, Boys' and Girls' Soccer, and Volleyball.  
 International Club - Students hold fundraisers (car washes, dances, etc.) to help defray the costs of trips to foreign countries (France, Canada, and Spain).  Each year, members participate in a field trip to experience French and Spanish culture in a local atmosphere.
 Junior Classical League – This is a club for high school students who study Latin. They participate in state and national conferences and competitions.
 Literary Magazine – The Realm – This club showcases the talents of TMHS' aspiring artists and writers.
 Math Team – This club provides an opportunity for students to compete with other schools in academically challenging mathematical contests.
 Mock Trial Team – Students engage in simulated trials of law, civic or criminal, against other teams statewide.
 National Honor Society (NHS) – This is an organization that recognizes and encourages academic achievement, while developing other characteristics of leadership, service, and character. Membership is by invitation and approval.
 Newspaper – The Press – This is published at least four times during the year. It reports on events and happenings at TMHS.
 Peer Leadership – This is an organization that is dedicated to enhancing the general school climate. Part of their work involves peer mediation and violence prevention programs
 Renaissance Program – This program whose goals are to enhance the academic environment and promote effort, honesty, and tolerance. Students fulfilling the necessary criteria benefit from rewards such as exam exemptions and business discounts.
 Robotics Club – With the help of engineer mentors from local firms, students design, build and compete a robot in the FIRST Robotics Competition.
 SADD – Students Against Destructive Decisions.
 Spring Sports – Baseball, Softball, Boys' and Girls' Spring Track, Boys' and Girls' Tennis, Boys' and Girls' Lacrosse, Dance Team
 Student Council – This group of students organizes and conducts leadership, spirit, community and charity service activities at TMHS and in the community. Hosts and participates in regional and statewide conferences.
 GSA – Support Group for Gender/Sexuality Alliance.
 Winter Sports – Hockey, Gymnastics, Boys' and Girls' Basketball, Cheerleading, Boys' and Girls' Winter Track, Wrestling
 Yearbook – Scroll – It's a year of TMHS put on paper to be remembered always. Underclassmen are needed for some sections.

Construction of new school building in 2012

The school was placed on warning status by the New England Association of Schools and Colleges (NEASC) in 2006. In 2010 the town voted to build a new high school next to the old one to address structural issues leading to the institution of this warning status.

The new school cost $68 million, a majority funding athletic facilities, and opened in August 2012. The gymnasium seats 1,225 fans, featuring one main basketball court and three intermediate courts that can be separated for tournament or recreational league use. The gym is used for all future TMHS graduations. The auditorium/theater features seating for 690 and the stage has a backstage area for work on theatrical productions. Some of the more distinguishing characteristics of the complex include airport style restrooms for students, shared prep areas behind science and art classrooms, a TV studio, and two large rooms that can accommodate three or four classes meeting together.  The entire complex features copious amounts of glass for maximum natural lighting.  This ties in with numerous green features that add to the energy efficiency of the school and guarantee an additional reimbursement from the state.  Freshman Orientation was on August 27, 2012, and the first official day of school in the new building was on August 28, 2012.  As of September 2012, the new high school was finally complete, though the exterior features including the parking lot and track and field were delayed for a while longer.  Demolition for the old high school began in mid-August 2012 and finished well into 2013.

References

External links 
 

Merrimack Valley Conference
Schools in Middlesex County, Massachusetts
Public high schools in Massachusetts